QtWeb is a discontinued free and open-source web browser developed by LogicWare & LSoft Technologies. QtWeb used the WebKit browser engine that was embedded in the Qt framework.

Features 
 Ad filtering (AdBlock function) 
 BitTorrent download manager
 Bookmarks (including bookmarks import and aliases)
 Customisable keyboard shortcut
 Customisable search engines
 Customisable User Agent (Firefox, Internet Explorer, Safari, Chrome)
 Downloads manager
 Mouse gestures
 Privacy mode
 Pop-up blocking
 Portable version available
 Saving web sites in the PDF format
 Tabbed browsing
  Web Inspector for debugging, editing, and monitoring web pages

Reception 
QtWeb has been described as a lightweight web browser which offers some amount of customisable features, speed and simplicity to navigate. However it has been criticised for the lack of extensions support, no way to run Java and its problems to work with several websites.

References

External links 

 

Cross-platform free software
Software based on WebKit
Free software projects
Free web browsers
MacOS web browsers
Web browsers that use Qt
Unix Internet software
Windows web browsers